The Manhunters are a fictional race of extraterrestrial robots that appear in titles published by DC Comics.

Publication history
The broader history behind the alien robot species covered in this article was introduced in Justice League of America #140 (March 1977), in a story by Steve Englehart and Dick Dillin.

Fictional character biography

Interstellar police

The Manhunters are the first attempt of the Guardians of the Universe to create an interstellar police force that could combat evil all over the cosmos. Their name and much of their code of behavior is modeled by the Guardians of the Universe on the Manhunters of Ma'aleca'andra (Mars) millions of years ago (This creates an apparent chronology problem, since the Manhunters were created many millions of years ago, while the Green Martian race were retconned as having come into existence from the Burning Martians only about 20,000 years ago.) For thousands of years, they serve the Guardians well. However, the Manhunters become obsessed with the act of "hunting" criminals. Their code, "No man escapes the Manhunters" (corrupted from the original "No evil..."), becomes more important to them than seeing justice done.

Exile
Eventually, the robots conspire to rebel against their masters, but the Guardians defeat and destroy most of them. Those that survived hide away on many planets, slowly rebuilding their forces and spreading their beliefs to others. Since then, the over-riding goal of the Manhunters has been to take revenge on the Guardians, as well as on their replacements, the Green Lantern Corps.

The Manhunters infiltrate and liberate many planets disguised as living beings and create a "Cult of the Manhunters" that trains others to be their minions. On Mars, the people of that world start a group of Martian Manhunters based on the lessons of preserving justice taught unto them by the Manhunters and even erect a temple based on the appearance of their inspiration. On Earth, most of the Manhunters' agents are unaware that their masters are robots, or that their real purposes are not noble. Some of these agents became superheroes also known as Manhunters. They wear red-and-blue costumes patterned after the Manhunters themselves. The most famous of these is a big game hunter called Paul Kirk. He is active in the 1940s, and stars in his own series. The character is brought back in a modern version in the 70s, in which he was supposedly killed years before but was in truth placed in suspended animation by a secret conspiracy. He is cloned, and when he finally reawakes, he dedicates himself to battling those who had used him. He dies in the process, but some of his clones survived.

The Manhunters are discovered by the Justice League who seemingly defeats the Manhunter's leader, the Grandmaster. One of their human pawns, Mark Shaw, adopts a new identity as the costumed hero, the Privateer but is later discovered to be a criminal posing as a hero.

Millennium

Years later, it is revealed that the Manhunters not only still exist, but have infiltrated the lives of most superheroes with their agents. They even manage to infiltrate the Olympian Gods, one of their number posing as the goat god Pan, as shown during the Challenge of the Gods storyline. They reveal themselves when a Guardian and a member of the Zamarons try to evolve some humans into becoming the next Guardians of the Universe, during what becomes known as the Millennium crisis. On this occasion, there is a massive counterstrike operation by the heroes against the Manhunters, and it seems that the Grandmaster has finally been destroyed, along with their hidden home planet. Former Privateer Mark Shaw readopts his identity as Manhunter in the wake of the battle, seeking to redeem both the name and himself.

Post-Emerald Twilight
Kyle Rayner encounters the Manhunters not long after Hal Jordan's destruction of the Guardians and the Central Power Battery on Oa. The first of the androids encounters a still inexperienced Kyle Rayner and is almost able to defeat him using brute force until Kyle uses his wits to outsmart and destroy it (Green Lantern (vol. 3) #117). The next time, multiple Manhunters appear. They are all sentient individuals, upgraded by a passing alien ship with technology onboard that gives them a hive consciousness. They capture Kyle in an attempt to use his last remaining Green Lantern ring for their purposes. They fail and Kyle manages to escape (Green Lantern (vol. 3) #129-131).

Sector 3601

When the Manhunters are replaced by the Green Lantern Corps, they retreat to Biot, their homeworld in Sector 3601, an uncharted area of space incapable of sustaining organic life. Hank Henshaw, the Cyborg Superman, comes to Biot and becomes the Manhunters' new Grandmaster. He uses his mastery over machinery and Kryptonian technology to upgrade the Manhunters with organic enhancements, resulting behavioral developments such as emotions. They seem to have rebuilt the first Central Power Battery originally destroyed by Hal Jordan (under the influence of Parallax). Henshaw decides not to interfere in the reformation of the Green Lantern Corps after an encounter between a Manhunter and Green Lanterns Hal Jordan and Guy Gardner.

Sinestro Corps

The Manhunters later resurface as part of the Sinestro Corps. Some of them carry miniature yellow Power Batteries inside them which are used by the Sinestro Corps members to charge their yellow power rings while others still carry the green ones for taking powers from the Green Lanterns' rings.

Secret Origin
In the Green Lantern: Secret Origin storylines (which revises Hal Jordan's beginnings), it is revealed that the Manhunters suffered a programming glitch that caused them to wipe out all life in space sector 666, believing it to be evil. It is this event that gives rise to the Five Inversions, the only survivors of the massacre, who vow to make the Guardians pay for what their creations had done.

Blackest Night
During the events of Blackest Night, it is revealed that Amanda Waller and King Faraday have a deactivated Manhunter in their possession, having recovered it from the Belle Reve swamp after the Millennium event (which the Suicide Squad had a hand in stopping). Waller sends the Manhunter to Belle Reve in order to assist the Secret Six and the Suicide Squad in their battle with members of the Black Lantern Corps. Waller ultimately uses a self-destruct mechanism to destroy the Manhunter, unleashing an explosion of Green Lantern energy that eradicates the Black Lanterns.

Brightest Day
It is eventually revealed that the programming glitch the Manhunters suffered is caused by Krona during Brightest Day to prove to the other Guardians of the Universe that there are flaws in an emotionless police force.

The New 52
During The New 52, while running from the Alpha Lanterns, John Stewart and Guy Gardner find dozens of deactivated Manhunters in the Guardian's Ring Foundry. They re-energize the robots using the Foundry essence in order to fend off the Alphas. However, during the fight, the Manhunters are accidentally fused in a massive bio-mechanic monster. It has since been revealed that the Manhunters were created to apprehend the First Lantern during a time the Maltusians were still trying to harness the Emerald Light of Willpower in the Emotional Spectrum which they eventually would use as a source of energy to fuel their efforts to police the cosmos.

Chant
The Manhunters have had a mixture of oaths over the years: "No evil escapes the Manhunters!", "Death to the Green Lantern Corps!", and "No man escapes the Manhunters!"

Highmaster

The Highmaster is the supreme Manhunter which appeared on Orinda in Justice League International #10. He resembles a gigantic yellow manhunter and was destroyed by Hal Jordan and Superman.

Technology
Manhunter technology has been used in the creation of the OMAC drones. The Kryptonian technology was incorporated into the Manhunters by Hank Henshaw on Biot, which enabled them to use the Central Power Battery on Oa as a power source for the Manhunters.
Originally the Manhunters used special energy pistols which were charged by the Green Lanterns which they carried.

Other versions

Injustice: Gods Among Us
A Manhunter makes a cameo appearance in Injustice: Gods Among Us'''s prequel comic. In a flashback in chapter seven of Year Two, Sinestro is attacked by a Manhunter, though he easily dispatches it before bringing its body before the Guardians of the Universe.

Star Trek/Green Lantern
In the sequel to Star Trek/Green Lantern: The Spectrum War, a year after the Green Lanterns and their various allies arrived in the new Star Trek timeline, Saint Walker discovers a Manhunter crashed on a distant moon, with the age of the impact damage suggesting that this Manhunter is native to the Trek universe rather than coming from the Lanterns' reality.

Earth One
Hundreds of years prior to the events depicted in Green Lantern: Earth One, the Manhunters wiped out the majority of the Green Lantern Corps and captured the Central Power Battery, which was assumed destroyed. In a reverse of most versions of their origin story, the Manhunters were created by the Guardians of Oa to replace the Corps, who they felt had become too independent. The Manhunters however turned on the Guardians, killing all but a single survivor who fled to an alternate dimension. The Manhunters carved out an empire in the space previously patrolled by the Green Lanterns, centred on Oa. Hal Jordan, an asteroid miner who had stumbled onto a Power Ring was captured and taken to Oa, which the Manhunters had converted into a mine. Jordan was able to find the Central Battery and summon the remaining Ring bearers to Oa. By creating a controlled feedback loop between the Central Battery and their Rings, the Lanterns were able to destroy the majority of the Manhunters, although the surviving Manhunters still pose a significant threat.

In other media
Television
 The Manhunters appear in the Justice League episode "In Blackest Night" voiced by James Remar. Like their comic counterparts, they predate the Green Lantern Corps. According to the Guardians, "they couldn't understand the subtle gradations between good and evil" and as such, they are reprogrammed for performing other tasks such as hunting and guarding. After this demotion, the Manhunters secretly plot their revenge against the Guardians. Green Lantern John Stewart is later brought to trial on the planet Ajuris 5 for accidentally destroying Ajuris 4. Unknown to everyone else, the planet's destruction was faked by the Manhunters with the help of Kanjar Ro, as part of their plan to overthrow the Oans and take the Corps' power source. Their gambit draws five Guardians and several Green Lanterns away from Oa, leaving the planet's defenses weakened enough to allow the Manhunters to attack. The Justice League clears John's name and helps the Corps defeat the Manhunters in Oa. However, the lead Manhunter manages to absorb the power of the Central Battery, which makes him become a giant energy being. Reciting the Green Lantern oath, John absorbs the battery's power, and by extension the Manhunter, into his ring. He then expels the evil of the Manhunter and restores the Central Battery. This is based on the comics story "No Man Escapes The Manhunters", from Justice League of America #140-141 (1977).
 The Manhunters appear in the Green Lantern: The Animated Series, voiced by Josh Keaton. They are seen as illustrations in the episode "Reckoning", in walls of glass that detail the history of the Red Lantern Corps, and are noted to have slaughtered Atrocitus' race, leading to his transformation into the first Red Lantern. In the episode "Regime Change", Hal Jordan presents this information to the Guardians, initially believing it to be a lie. However the Guardians shamefully reveal they were indeed responsible for the creation of the Manhunters, and that the machines had massacred a number of innocent planets due to their inability to interact with emotional beings. The second half of the first season shows the Manhunters are being rebuilt to act as the Anti-Monitor's foot soldiers. According to both the Guardians and the Manhunters themselves, the cause for the destruction was the Manhunters viewing all emotion as the source of evil and thus seeking to exterminate it.

Film
 The Manhunters are mentioned at the end of Green Lantern: Emerald Knights. When the Green Lantern Corps are out to build a new planet, Hal Jordan mentions to Arisia Rrab about how he took on an army of Manhunters, and his only backup was a squirrel.

Video games
 The Manhunters appear in DC Universe Online, voiced by David Jennison. They assist the Sinestro Corps with their fight against the Green Lanterns. Some broken Manhunters were rebuilt into remote fear generators to boost the power of the Sinestro Corps' power rings.
 The Manhunters were the main antagonists in Green Lantern: Rise of the Manhunters, which was set in the same continuity as the Green Lantern live-action film, voiced by Fred Tatasciore. They ally with Amon Sur - who resents that his father's ring went to a primitive like Hal Jordan rather than himself - in an attempt to acquire the yellow fear energy that the Guardians have acquired in the distant past and use it as a power source for themselves.
 While not making an actual appearance, the Manhunters are mentioned in Lego Batman 3: Beyond Gotham. During a mission on Ysmault, Hal Jordan, Wonder Woman, Batman, Robin and Solomon Grundy stumble upon a shielded door that Jordan suggests must have belonged to the Manhunters in the past, while briefly explaining their origin to Robin.

Miscellaneous
Manhunters are featured in the Smallville Season 11'' digital comic based on the TV series.

References

External links
 DCU Guide: The Manhunters
 Alan Kistler's profile on Green Lantern

Characters created by Dick Dillin
Characters created by Steve Englehart
Comics characters introduced in 1977
DC Comics alien species
DC Comics robots
DC Comics supervillains
Fictional artificial intelligences
Green Lantern characters